María de la Asunción Mercader Forcada (6 March 1918 – 26 January 2011) was a Spanish film actress who appeared in some forty films between 1923 and 1992. Julian Gorkin wrote that her cousin was born Montserrat in the family of Caridad Mercader, mother of Ramon Mercader who murdered Russian revolutionary Leon Trotsky in 1940, and during and after the WWII Montserrat who was very similar to Maria used her documents. 

She moved to Italy in 1939. She was the second wife of film director Vittorio De Sica.

Selected filmography
 The King's Jester (1941)
 The Prisoner of Santa Cruz (1941)
 L'attore scomparso (1941)
 Forbidden Music (1942)
 A Garibaldian in the Convent (1942)
 The Gates of Heaven (1945)
 The Song of Life (1945)
 Heart (1948)
 Giovannino (1976)
 Lights and Shadows (1988)
 Count Max (1991)

References

External links

1918 births
2011 deaths
Spanish film actresses
Spanish silent film actresses
Spanish expatriates in Italy
Actresses from Barcelona
Film actresses from Catalonia
20th-century Spanish actresses